The 2012–13 SV Wehen Wiesbaden season was the 88th season in the club's football history. In 2012–13 the club played in the 3. Liga, the third tier of German football. It was the club's fourth season in this league, having been relegated from the 2. Fußball-Bundesliga in 2009.

Matches

Legend

Friendly matches

3.Liga

Sources

External links
 2012–13 SV Wehen Wiesbaden season at Weltfussball.de 
 2012–13 SV Wehen Wiesbaden season at kicker.de 
 2012–13 SV Wehen Wiesbaden season at Fussballdaten.de 

Wiesbaden
SV Wehen Wiesbaden seasons